The 1996 New Hampshire Democratic presidential primary was held on February 20, 1996, in New Hampshire as one of the Democratic Party's statewide nomination contests ahead of the 1996 United States presidential election. Incumbent President Bill Clinton easily won the primary, facing only minor opposition.

Results

† Indicates a write-in candidate

References

New Hampshire
1996 New Hampshire elections
New Hampshire Democratic primaries